Giorgi (Giga) Bokeria (born 20 April 1972 in Tbilisi) is a Georgian politician and was the secretary of the National Security Council of Georgia from November 2010 to November 2013. He is currently chairman of the Movement for Liberty - European Georgia.

Career 
From 1989 to 1995, Bokeria was one of the leaders of various student movements, in particular an active member of the Press Club of Tbilisi State University. In 1992, he began working as a journalist, in the newspaper 7 Dge (7 Days), as a political editor of newspaper Mimomkhilveli (Observer) – 1992–1993, journalist with the Pikis Saati (Rush Hour) program of Channel 1 of State Radio −1993, journalist of Radio Liberty – 1994, political editor of newspaper Argumenti (Argument) – 1995–1996, Akcentebi (Accents) talk show host of Rustavi 2 broadcasting company – 1996.

In 1996, together with Levan Ramishvili, Bokeria co-founded the Liberty Institute, a Georgian non-profit, non-partisan, liberal public policy advocacy foundation, taking the job of coordinating human rights programs and later the position of senior legal advisor.

In 2003, after a visit to Serbia to study peaceful revolution techniques, Bokeria helped bring Serb activists from the youth movement Otpor! to Georgia to train students in the same techniques. As a result, the youth movement "Kmara" was established, which played a leading role in the November 2003 Rose Revolution. After the Revolution, Bokeria was elected to Parliament where he has authored a number laws to strengthen human rights in Georgia.

Bokeria was a Member of Parliament from 2004 to 2008. He is the Deputy Chairman of the Committee on Legal Issues and is a Member of Committee on Defense and Security. From 2005 to 2008 he was Vice-President of the Parliamentary Assembly of the Council of Europe (PACE) and he was vice-chairman of the Alliance of Liberals and Democrats for Europe group in the assembly and in 2008 along with United National Movement and later European Georgia - Movement for Liberty he moved to EPP Group. In April 2008, he was moved to the post of deputy Foreign Minister of Georgia, and in November 2010 to Secretary of the National Security Council. He resigned on 15 November 2013 after Georgia elected its new president, Giorgi Margvelashvili. He was succeeded by the Georgian Dream lawmaker Irina Imerlishvili. From 2016 to 2020 he was member of Parliament of Georgia. In 2017 after the split in the United National Movement, together with other former leaders of UNM, Bokeria co-founded European Georgia - Movement for Liberty party and remains the chairman of the party till the present day.

Family 
Bokeria is married to Tamara Chergoleishvili, editor-in-chief of the Tbilisi-based magazine Tabula (ტაბულა). Bokeria's mother is the chess grandmaster Nana Alexandria.

References

External links
 
Biographical entry on the website of Georgia's parliament
Biographical entry on the website of the Parliamentary Assembly of the Council of Europe
Hugh Pope, The Wall Street Journal: Pro-West leaders in Georgia push Shevardnadze out (en)
Giga Bokeria, Givi Targamadze, Levan Ramishvili: Georgian Media in the 90s: A step to liberty, 1997 (en) (PDF-Datei)

1972 births
Living people
Politicians from Tbilisi
Mingrelians
United National Movement (Georgia) politicians
Members of the Parliament of Georgia
Nonviolence advocates
European Georgia politicians
Chevening Scholars